Antakalnis (literally , adapted in ) is an eldership in the Vilnius city municipality, Lithuania. Antakalnis is one of the oldest, and largest historical suburbs of Vilnius City. It is in the eastern section of Vilnius, along the left bank of the Neris River, with the river running along the whole western side of the district.

One of the greatest Lithuanian Baroque masterpieces, the Roman Catholic Church of St. Peter and St. Paul, is in Antakalnis, as is Sapieha Palace (Sapiegų rūmai). Sapieha Palace is surrounded by the only surviving Baroque-style park in Lithuania, which contains the oldest linden tree in Vilnius.

Antakalnis is home to the historically important Antakalnis Cemetery, where victims of the January Events in 1991, killed by the Soviet Army, are buried; their graves are often visited, as they are considered national heroes of Lithuania.

Antakalnis eldership includes the recreational area and prestigious cottage district Valakampiai, where two river beaches have been established. The current and former president of Lithuania, the prime minister of Lithuania, and other state officials reside in the Turniškės neighborhood of Antakalnis.

The Botanical Garden of Vilnius University lies in Kairėnai, the settlement in the eastern part of the district.

The Jewish surnames Antokolec, Antokolsky and variants derive from the Polish pronunciation of the district's name.

History 
Antakalnis is one of the oldest parts of Vilnius. Historically, the suburb of Antakalnis developed along a road to Aukštaitija and Viršupis, the summer palace of the grand dukes.

Areas 
Antakalnis eldership includes these city parts: Aukštagiris, Aukštieji Karačiūnai, Antakalnis, Antaviliai, Baniškės, Didieji Pupojai, Dvarčionys, Galgiai, Gvazdikai, Kalnai, Kairėnai, Liepynė, Mažieji Pupojai, Meiriškės, Mileišiškės, Pečiukai, Pylimėliai, Sapieginė, Saulėtekis, Smėlynė, Šilas, Šilėnai, Turniškės, Vaguva, Valakampiai, Aukštoji Veržuva, Žemoji Veržuva, Vinciūniškės, Vismalai, Vismaliukai, Vyriai, Žemieji Karačiūnai.

Tourist Attractions

 Pavilniai Regional Park
 Antakalnis Park of Benches
 UNO Park Vilnius
 Colorful Springs

Famous people
Famous Lithuanians having lived in Antakalnis eldership:
Valdas Adamkus, former President of Lithuania
Mark Antokolski, sculptor
Algirdas Brazauskas, former president and Prime Minister of Lithuania
Janina Degutytė, poet
Vytautas Kernagis, actor and composer
Andrius Kubilius, former Prime Minister of Lithuania
Andrius Mamontovas, a rock singer
Virgilijus Noreika, an opera singer
Rolandas Paksas, former President of Lithuania
Paulius Širvys, poet
Sofija Veiverytė, artist/painter
Ingrida Šimonytė, former Minister of Finance and Prime Minister of Lithuania
Jurga Ivanauskaitė, writer

Twin towns
  2nd district of Budapest, Hungary

References

External links
 Antakalnis photogallery
 Visitor's guide to Antalkalnis Cemetery

Neighbourhoods of Vilnius